Deer Creek is a stream in Webster and Humboldt counties, Iowa, in the United States. It is a tributary of the Des Moines River.

Deer Creek was so named from the fact that the surrounding area was a hunting ground of deer.

See also
List of rivers of Iowa

References

Rivers of Humboldt County, Iowa
Rivers of Webster County, Iowa
Rivers of Iowa